Haberdashers' Hatcham College (formerly Haberdashers' Aske's Hatcham College) is a state secondary school with academy status and a music specialism located in New Cross. The school was formerly a grammar school, then a comprehensive City Technology College and now an Academy operating between two sites near New Cross Gate in South-East London.

In 2005 the Worshipful Company of Haberdashers established the Haberdashers' Aske's Academies Federation, which includes HAHC.

History
After a bequest made by the merchant Robert Aske to the Worshipful Company of Haberdashers on his death in 1689, a school and almshouses were built at Hoxton near the city of London.  When, in 1874, the almshouses were closed, the educational capacity was enlarged and split into two parts, one north of the river and one south.  The northern section established a boys' and girls' school in Hoxton, which eventually became Haberdashers' Aske's Boys' School and Haberdashers' Aske's School for Girls, both now sited in Elstree, Hertfordshire.  For the southern section, land was purchased at Hatcham, now better known as New Cross Gate, for the foundation of boys' and girls' schools on what is now known as Telegraph Hill.  The north London school became generally known as "Haberdashers'", while the south London schools became generally known as "Aske's", though their official titles were parallel.  Former pupils of the Hatcham schools are called "Old Askeans".

Two schools were complete on the site now on Pepys Road by late 1875, and in 1889 the site now on Jerningham Road was purchased and the girls' school relocated to the new site.

Under the Education Act 1944 the two schools became grammar schools, and in 1979 became comprehensive schools.

A failing local primary school, Monson Road, was closed.  The college and secondary school were joined together, giving all pupils preferential and automatic rights to attend secondary education.  Initial optimism for this new school was short lived following a fire at the new Temple Grove school in 2010.  There were no injuries, but the school was forced to move to the Hatcham College main site, with temporary buildings at the College being erected.  The temporary buildings were estimated to last for up to three years.

In January 2012, the then UK education secretary, Michael Gove, visited the school and gave a speech defending the government policy of converting local authority funded state schools into central government funded academies.

In October 2012, a criminal investigation was launched into fraud allegations at the Haberdashers’ Aske’s Federation academy trust chain. A 55 year old male member of staff was suspended while the a civil case was launched against him to recover the defrauded funds.

In June 2014, Adrian Percival, the then CEO of Haberdashers' Aske's Federation Trust, wrote to parents asking "that nobody comments publicly on this situation."

In July 2014, conservative MP, Edward Timpson, reported to Parliament that £2.16 million had been defrauded from The Haberdashers' Aske's Federation Trust between the years 2010 to 2012. A statement from the federation said "It appears that the fraud was extremely sophisticated and involved the theft of a substantial amount of money effected through a large number of transactions processed over seven years, and involved one individual staff member in a position of trust acting alone."

On 22 July 2014, BBC London News televised a report on the civil case made by Haberdashers' Aske's Federation Trusts against their former accounts manager Samuel Kayode, a Nigerian accountant and part-time pastor, attempting to recover £4.1m Kayode paid into his personal account over a 7-year period.

In June 2016, a criminal case against the perpetrator of the fraud commenced at Woolwich Crown Court.

On 24 June 2016, The Woolwich Crown Court sentenced Samuel Kayode to jail for 9 years. Of the £4.1m stolen by Kayode only £800,000 was recovered. Prosecutor James Thacker stated "It is believed to be Britain’s biggest education fraud".

In September 2021 the school dropped the 'Aske's' from its title following controversy over the legacy of Robert Aske.

Current organisation
In 1995 the two schools were combined under a single headteacher (Dr Elizabeth Sidwell - formerly girls' school headteacher and former chief executive officer of the federation), and the name Haberdashers' Aske's Hatcham College. Sidwell resigned in 2011 and was replaced by Mr Adrian Percival. Teaching continues to be largely single-sex except for the co-educational sixth form. Boys and girls were generally taught on their traditional separate sites until 2002, when the boys' and girls' sites were re-organised as lower-school and upper-school sites. Years 7, 8 and 9 are based at the Jerningham Road site; years 10, 11 and the 6th Form are based at the Pepys Road site. The school sports field is located close by on St. Asaph Road in Nunhead.

The former College Principal was Mr Declan Jones, who was previously deputy Principal and replaced Mrs Michelle Adamson. Dr Elizabeth M Sidwell became the CEO of the Haberdashers' Aske's Academies Federation after holding the position of Principal until the creation of the federation. The role of the CEO has now been taken over by Mr Adrian Percival and Dr Elizabeth M Sidwell has moved from Aske's to become Schools Commissioner for England.

The forms in each year belong to one of four houses. These are named after significant figures in the college's history and are identified by colours. The students belong to the same house for their school life and belong to either Connolly - Green (formerly Doigs/Dodkins), Dyson - Red (formerly Mackenzies/Jethas), Goddard - Blue (formerly Lawrences/Crocketts) or Soper - Yellow (formerly Fords/Patricks); all are named after previous headmasters or headmistresses (formerly heads of houses, Mr Doig, Miss F Mackenzie, Mr Dodkins and Mrs Ford), with the exception of the last, in honour of distinguished Old Askean Donald Soper. The students wear a blue school tie with stripes in their house colour.  The school badge is the coat of arms of the Haberdashers' Company, and displays the motto "Serve And Obey".

Notable alumni

 Katy B singer-songwriter
 Danny Bowes, lead singer in rock band Thunder
 Fiona Bruce, newsreader and television presenter
 Melvyn Gale, Musician, Electric Light Orchestra
 Sidney Green and Richard Hills "Sid Green and Dick Hills" Co-writers for Morecambe and Wise
 Steve Harley, Lead Singer, Steve Harley & Cockney Rebel
 Chris Lambert, Olympic sprinter
 David Leslie Linton, geographer
 Dane Baptiste, writer, comedian, podcaster and actor
 Scott Parker, England Football Captain
 Karl Parsons, Stained Glass Artist
 Peter Perrett, Lead singer & songwriter, The Only Ones
 Harry Price, Psychic researcher
 Rafe Spall, Actor
 Karla-Simone Spence, actress
 Djed Spence, Football player
 Jeremy Strong, Children's writer
 Lyle Taylor, Football player
 Susan Watts Science editor BBC Newsnight
 Bill Wedderburn, Baron Wedderburn of Charlton, lawyer, academic and Peer.
 Bradley Wright-Phillips, Football player
 Shaun Wright-Phillips, Football player

Partner Schools
  The School was twinned with The Thomas Hardye School in Dorset early 2012

References

External links
 College website

Haberdashers' Schools
Academies in the London Borough of Lewisham
Educational institutions established in 1874
Former city technology colleges
Secondary schools in the London Borough of Lewisham
1874 establishments in England
New Cross
Specialist music colleges in England